Qarikənd (also, Qarıkənd and Karykend) is a village in the Gadabay Rayon of Azerbaijan.  The village forms part of the municipality of Gərgər.

Time Zone 
AZT (UTC+4)

Summer (DST)	AZT (UTC+5)

References 

Populated places in Gadabay District